Arbour is a surname. Notable people with the name include:

 Al Arbour (1932–2015), Canadian ice hockey player, coach, and executive
 Amos Arbour (1895–1943), Canadian ice hockey player
 Beatrice Arbour (1920–2019), All-American Girls Professional Baseball League player
 Jack Arbour (1899–1973), Canadian ice hockey defenceman 
 John Arbour (born 1945), Canadian ice hockey player
 Louise Arbour (born 1947), Canadian lawyer, prosecutor and jurist
 Nicole Arbour, Canadian cheerleader and singer
 Tony Arbour (born 1945), British Conservative Party politician
 Ty Arbour (1896–1979), Canadian ice hockey player
 Victoria Arbour, Canadian evolutionary biologist and palaeontologist

See also
 List of family relations in the NHL

English-language surnames
French-language surnames